Rezaul Haque (born 20 November 1982) is a Bangladeshi first-class cricketer who played for Sylhet Division.

References

External links
 

1982 births
Living people
Bangladeshi cricketers
Sylhet Division cricketers
People from Sylhet